Dina Ugorskaja (26 August 1973 - 17 September 2019) was a German pianist of Russian provenance.

Life
Dina Ugorskaja was born in Leningrad (as Saint Petersburg was known at that time) and grew up in a family of musicians. Her father, whom she predeceased in 2019, is the notable pianist Anatol Ugorski. Maja Elik (1933 - 2012), her mother, was a musicologist who was born in Prague (where her parents studied at the time) and grew up in Bălți (Bessarabia). Her parents had first met in 1967, working on the Soviet premier of Schoenberg's Pierrot Lunaire. Maja Elik, who was working for a music publisher, had been engaged to produce a Russian text for the work's German language "Sprechgesang".

Ugorskaja's first piano teacher was her father. She made her public debut when she was seven, performing at the Leningrad Philharmonia Hall in 1980. Between 1980 and 1990 she attended the specialist music academy of the Leningrad Conservatory, studying piano and composition. Here her piano teachers were Maria Mekler and (as before) her father, while her composition studies were undertaken with the man who was in charge of the piano department, Evgenij Irschai. Alongside her studies at the academy, she also took singing lessons, with a focus on early music. She was still only 14 when she appeared as a soloist in her first orchestral concert, performing Beethoven's 4th Piano Concerto in her home city. Just one year later, in 1989, Ugorskaja made her public debut as a composer with the first performance of her string quartet at the Leningrad Philharmonia Hall.

The Perestroika years in the Soviet Union were accompanied by an increase in lawlessness and public antisemitism. Dina Ugorskaja found herself on the receiving end of increasingly savage racist threats from supporters of Pamyat, a "patriotic" nationalist organisation. Dina Ugorskaja was barely 16 when Anatol Ugorski hastily relocated his family to East Berlin, where they arrived without even having taken time to get their identity papers in order. 1989/90 was a period of great change in the "German Democratic Republic", and the unfolding political developments in Berlin appeared to hold out the prospect of an international career for Anatol Ugorski. As matters turned out, there would also be very significant professional opportunities for his daughter, who immediately submitted a successful application for admission to the city's Hochschule für Musik "Hanns Eisler". Here she studied between 1990 and 1992:  she was taught by Annerose Schmidt and Galina Iwanzowa.    She subsequently moved on to the Detmold Music Academy ("Hochschule für Musik") where she studied (again) under Galina Iwanzowa, and also as a  "master student" with Nerine Barrett and in 2001 passed her post-graduate level concert exams ("Konzertexamen") degree.   Ugorskaja retained her close links with Detmold where she taught piano from 2002 till 2007 and held an associate professorship.

Having relocated to Munich in 2007/08, in October 2016 she accepted an invitation to take up a post as professor for piano and harpsichord at the Ludwig van Beethoven Institute of the University of Music and Performing Arts ("Universität für Musik und darstellende Kunst") in Vienna.   Slightly more than three years later, on 27 November 2019, friends at the Beethoven Institute were attending a memorial event for their former colleague.   Dina Ugorskaja died of cancer at her home in Munich on Tuesday 17 September 2019, after a period of illness.   She was 46.   She was survived by her husband, her daughter and her father.

Career highlights
Dina Ugorskaja gave concerts in Germany, Russia, France, Austria and Ukraine.   She played at the Leipzig Gewandhaus concert hall and at the Schwetzingen Festival.  She also performed at a large number of other festivals, including the "Hitzacker Days of Music" ("Sommerliche Musiktage Hitzacker") festival and the Dijon Music Festival.   Notable conductors with whom she appeared included Vladimir Jurowski, Peter Gülke and Frank Beermann.   She performed regularly with the MDR Leipzig Radio Symphony Orchestra and the North West German Philharmonic Orchestra).

She teamed up with her father to issue a recording of concertos for two pianos by Bach (Concerto in C minor: BWV 1060), Mozart's Concerto No. 10 in E-flat major and the Shostakovich's Concertino for two pianos op.94.   Further recordings followed, including one of the Beethoven First Piano Concerto with the Pforzheim-based South-west German Chamber Orchestra conducted, as in the case of her earlier two-piano concerto recordings with her father, by Vladislav Czarnecki.

Notes

References

1973 births
2019 deaths
Musicians from Saint Petersburg
Musicians from Berlin
Musicians from Vienna
German classical pianists
20th-century classical pianists
21st-century classical pianists
Academic staff of the University of Music and Performing Arts Vienna
Russian emigrants to Germany
Soviet people of Jewish descent
Women classical pianists
20th-century Russian musicians
20th-century Russian women musicians
20th-century German musicians
21st-century German musicians
20th-century women pianists
21st-century women pianists